Malkapur may refer to:

 Malkapur, Akola, Maharashtra, India
 Malkapur, Buldhana, Maharashtra, India
 Malkapur railway station
 Malkapur (Vidhan Sabha constituency)
 Malkapur, Karad, Maharashtra, India
 Malkapur, Kolhapur, Maharashtra, India
 Malkapur, Ranga Reddy, Telangana, India
 Malkapur, Yadadri Bhuvanagiri, Telangana, India
 Malkapur Municipal Council, Satara district, Maharashtra